The Yamaha MT-100 Multi-track Cassette Recorder was an analog tool developed to record artists in the late 1980s. It was marketed just before the advent of Digital Audio Tape.
In essence, it allowed variable speed recording of 4 tracks of audio that could be mixed, merged and re-recorded onto standard cassette tapes. It had its broadest applications with keyboard and guitar players.

The Yamaha MT-100 was useful for capturing multi part ideas quickly and simply. Yamaha also created the DX7 keyboard, RX 5 drum machine, RX 11 DRUM Machine and QX1 sequencer.  A sequencer is a device that records MIDI Data digitally capturing musical arrangement code vs. capturing sounds on tape. This was a revelation at the time for people working with Samplers and Synthesizers that had multi-track music sequencer built in.

Direct line in recording from sequencers allowed for remarkably clean recordings within a usable dynamic audio range.

References

MT-100